Tha Connect is the debut studio album by American rapper Willy Northpole from Phoenix, Arizona. It was released on June 23, 2009 via Disturbing tha Peace. Production was handled by several record producers, including Reefa, Bangladesh, Blac Elvis, LT Moe, Nard & B and Tha Bizness. It features guest appearances from B.o.B., Bobby V and Ne-Yo. The album's first week sales were 8,000. As of October 18, 2009 the album has 20,000 record sales.

Background 
The album concept is the connecting hip hop listeners to a new state, Arizona. The album was in the works for several years and was originally slated for a release of winter 2008, but a conflict with fellow member of DTP Ludacris set the album back to June 2, 2009. Later the album was pushed to June 23, 2009. The album had 50 songs that were slimmed down to 12 songs, taking nearly 6 months. The album had several big hits that were "Too Big" for his first album. The album promotion was set up to be big with commercials during the BET Awards and billboards of the album but once the death of Michael Jackson all the promotion was dropped and the buzz for the album was gone.

Track listing

Sample credits
Track 5 contains samples from "Soldier", performed by Destiny's Child featuring T.I. and Lil Wayne

Music videos 
 Hood Dreamer - (April 13, 2009)
 Body Marked Up - (May 9, 2009)
 Ghetto Tour Guide - (May 11, 2009)
 1 Side Chick - (July 1, 2009)

Chart positions

References

2009 debut albums
Albums produced by Reefa
Albums produced by Nard & B
Disturbing tha Peace albums
Albums produced by Tha Bizness
Albums produced by Bangladesh (record producer)